Alexander Iosafovich Ievreinov (August 28, 1851 – 1929) was an Imperial Russian brigade, division and corps commander. He was made a captain in 1881, a Podpolkovnik (lieutenant colonel) in 1885, a Polkovnik (colonel) in 1889, a major general in 1899, and a lieutenant general in 1906.

Awards
Order of Saint Stanislaus (House of Romanov), 3rd class, 1875
Order of Saint Anna, 3rd class, 1880
Order of Saint Stanislaus (House of Romanov), 2nd class, 1883
Order of Saint Anna, 2nd class, 1887
Order of Saint Vladimir, 4th class, 1892
Order of Saint Vladimir, 3rd class, 1896
Order of Saint Stanislaus (House of Romanov), 1st class, 1904
Order of Saint Anna, 1st class (December 6, 1909)
Order of Saint Vladimir, 2nd class (December 6, 1913)
Order of Saint George, 4th degree (March 25, 1915)
Order of the White Eagle (Russian Empire) (April 9, 1915)

1851 births
1929 deaths
Russian military personnel of the Russo-Turkish War (1877–1878)
Russian military personnel of World War I
Recipients of the Order of Saint Stanislaus (Russian), 3rd class
Recipients of the Order of St. Anna, 3rd class
Recipients of the Order of Saint Stanislaus (Russian), 2nd class
Recipients of the Order of St. Anna, 2nd class
Recipients of the Order of St. Vladimir, 4th class
Recipients of the Order of St. Vladimir, 3rd class
Recipients of the Order of Saint Stanislaus (Russian), 1st class
Recipients of the Order of St. Anna, 1st class
Recipients of the Order of St. Vladimir, 2nd class
Recipients of the Order of the White Eagle (Russia)